Theo Logian is an American musician.

Theo moved to San Francisco from Arizona in 1994 to become a rock star. Nothing Cool later hit the charts in Japan.

Musical career
The Started-its, Theo Logian Explosion, Worth Taking, Nothing Cool, Belt Fight, Fabulous Disaster, The Razorburns, Reducer SF, The Dread, Teenage Harlets, Lugosi, The Home Alones, Baron Automatic, Critical Mess, John Brady Illegitimate Children (JB), Texas Thieves, Five Shitty Fingers, Alleged Masterminds.

Current Projects
THE STARTED-ITS:
Theo has been messing up music for many decades now.  He first met Joe Phort in 2008, when he booked a European tour with Will Farley and Neil Durkin to play with Nothing Cool.  After that tour, the 4 men wrote and recorded the first Theo Logian Explosion E.P. to tour in Japan during the winter of 2009.  Once they returned to the United States, Theo and Joe continued their "music" with a new band titled The Started-Its (featuring George Rider on bass guitar).  Since the release of Meet The Started-its, the band introduced a new bassist, Seiji Kurauchi.  Currently, this band plays shows in the San Francisco Bay Area a few times each year.

Dummyup Records
Jeremy and Theo decided to save some money and put out some records.

Dummyup Records Discography
Nothing Cool
What a Wonderful World
The Dread
The Dread
Baron Automatic
Way Funner
Grease
The Not So Original Soundtrack

Discography
Nothing Cool
Taking Advantage of Stupid People (1999) – drums, vocals
What a Wonderful World  (1997) – drums, vocals
Losers Hall Of Fame (1995) – drums, vocals
Idiot Word Search w/  The Lillingtons (1996) – drums, vocals
Nothing Cool / The Lillingtons (1996) – drums, vocals
The Unluckiest Man In The Universe (1997) – drums, vocals
Don't Tell Me What to Do (1995) – drums, vocals
Teenage Harlets
Best Dae (2002) – Bass, vocals
The Dread
Bonnie and Clyde (2000) – drums, vocals
The Started-its
Meet The Started-its (2011) – drums, vocals
The Logian Explosion
The Logian Explosion (2010) – drums, vocals
Worth Taking
Oddly Pacific (2013) – drums, vocals
Belt Fight
Belt Fight (1997) – drums, bass, vocals
John Brady's Illegitimate Children
You Asked For It! (1994) – drums

References

https://archive.org/details/MaximumRocknrollNo.161oct1996

External links
 http://thestartedits.com
 http://worthtaking.com

1976 births
Living people
Musicians from Washington, D.C.
American punk rock drummers
American male drummers
20th-century American drummers
21st-century American drummers
20th-century American male musicians
21st-century American male musicians